John Neely (January 29, 1930 in Chicago – October 8, 1994 in Richton Park, Illinois) was a jazz tenor saxophonist and arranger.

A member of King Fleming's Quintette (with Russell Williams and Lorez Alexandria) which recorded for the Chicago-based Blue Lake label in early 1954, he had played with Clifford Jordan in 1949.

In 1960, Neely recorded with pianist Earl Washington for the Formal label in a band which included Walter Perkins on drums.

That same year, Neely went on to join the Lionel Hampton band. Down Beat (February 2, 1961) wrote: "John Neely, 30 year old Chicagoan, is being hailed by his fellows as 'one of the baddest acts in the country and the next BIG man on tenor."

References 

American jazz saxophonists
American male saxophonists
African-American saxophonists
1930 births
1994 deaths
Musicians from Chicago
20th-century American saxophonists
Jazz musicians from Illinois
20th-century American male musicians
American male jazz musicians
20th-century African-American musicians